The Lviv Automobile Factory, mostly known under its obsolete name L’vivs’ky Avtobusnyi Zavod (literally "Lviv Bus Factory") was a bus manufacturing company in Lviv, Ukraine. Their brand-name is LAZ (ЛАЗ), and the company and its products are often referred to with this acronym rather than the full name.

It was one of the major bus manufacturers in the Soviet Union and the largest-ever industrial company in the city of Lviv. The factory is held by a private holding company.

History
The Lviv Bus Plant LAZ was built in 1945 to produce ZIS buses for the USSR. As an idea came about to create a whole new bus, the LAZ 695 bus was designed and approved by the Moscow Ministry of Transport. Production was launched in 1956 and continued until 2006. This is the most successful bus in the world and holds a world record for the longest in production. During the 1970s many new models were created such as the LAZ 699 and 697 which are both coach buses. In 1967, LAZ won the best bus in Europe at the Brussels auto show. LAZ was the first ever to create the low floor bus in 1963 called the LAZ 360 designed by Nami USSR. After the Soviet Union collapsed in 1991, LAZ suffered a big meltdown economically due to the loss of funding. Production stopped due to no orders. After the economy started to pick up, LAZ started to produce buses again. The LAZ 52523 was created. 

In 2001, LAZ was sold to Russian business tycoon Igor Churkin. After the sale of the company, the whole line of production was re-engineered to produce new buses for a low price. LAZ used a system called "flexible assembly line" which means that many different models could be produced on the same line because LAZ buses were all hand assembled. 

Some of its most widely known products included the LAZ-695 city bus and its stretched tourist-oriented version, the LAZ-699. ElectroLAZ, the distinctive modern LAZ trolleybus, can be seen circulating in over 25 cities around the world. LAZ provided transportation for the UEFA Euro 2012 championship that was held in Ukraine and Poland in 2012. The Ukraine government signed a contract to purchase 2500 new "CityLAZ" buses along with a possible 800 more. After the championship, LAZ buses were used as regular city transportation in the cities hosting EURO 2012.  In 2012, three new models were introduced: The LAZ 695 Soyuz, the LAZ 4207 DM, and the LAZ A183 CNG.

Facilities
LAZ Holding has two factories located in Ukraine. LAZ being the bigger one and DAZ being the smaller one.

LAZ is in Lviv, Ukraine and consists of over 300 buildings sitting in a small city of its own. The Factory Property is equipped with its own water pumping system, power transforming plant, gas filtration system, water cleaning and discharging system, machinery cooling system, centralized compressed air, fire house, police team, internal telephone/PA system, press building, laser cutting shop, chroming shop, metalworking shop, painting center, design borough, and marketing center. The Factory spans more than 20 city blocks wide and 30 deep.

DAZ is smaller, Consisting of 20 large buildings located in Kamianske. DAZ is equipped with a large assembly hall, central compressed air, welding, painting, testing center, and much more.

The central office for LAZ Holding is in Kyiv, Ukraine and is located in the city center.

Structure
LAZ Holding consists of a few companies. 
Lviv Bus Factory            "LAZ"
Dnipro Bus Factory          "DAZ"
Mykolaiv Machine Plant      "MMZ"
LAZ finance company         "LAZ Finance"
LAZ sales                   "Torhovyi dim LAZ"
LAZ Service and parts       "LAZ Service"
LAZ Holding central office  "Office Kyiv"
LAZ New York office         "Office New York"
Lemberg Coach Luxury buses  "Lemberg Coach"

Current models

NeoLAZ-12 (LAZ-5208)
Lemberg 5208MB - Tour coach on a Mercedes Benz chassis
Lemberg 5208MAN - Tour coach on a Man chassis
Lemberg 5208SP - Special purpose vehicle
NeoLAZ 5208MB - Mercedes chassis
NeoLAZ 5208ML - MAN engine
NeoLAZ 5208DM - Deutz engine
NeoLAZ 5208DT - Detroit engine
NeoLAZ-10 (LAZ-4207DM) - 10 meter coach bus on a LAZ chassis
AeroLAZ (LAZ-AX183D) - 12 meter airport bus which has doors on both sides
CityLAZ-10LE (LAZ-A152) - 10 meter city bus
CityLAZ-12
CityLAZ A183D1 - 12 meter low floor city bus
CityLAZ A183D4 - 12 meter bus with low floor and euro 4 engine
CityLAZ A183N1 - 12 meter bus with an EEv engine
CityLAZ A183F0 - 12 meter city bus
CityLAZ A183NG - 12 meter Natural Gas powered city bus CNG-Compressed Methane
CityLAZ A191 - 13.5 meter low floor city bus
CityLAZ A183-13.5 - 13.5 meter city bus
CityLAZ-20 (LAZ-A292) - 18.6 meter low floor city bus

ElectroLAZ-12
ElectroLAZ E183D1 - 12 meter trolley bus DC
ElectroLAZ E183D2 - 12 meter trolley bus DC 2 motors
ElectroLAZ E183A1 - 12 metre trolley bus AC
ElectroLAZ E183A2 - 12 metre trolley bus DC 2 motors
ElectroLAZ-20
ElectroLAZ E301D1 - 18.6 meter trolley bus DC
ElectroLAZ E301D2 - 18.6 meter trolley bus DC 2 motors
ElectroLAZ E301A1 - 18.6 meter trolley bus AC
ElectroLAZ E301A2 - 18.6 meter trolley bus DC 2 motors
InterLAZ 10LE (LAZ-42078) - 10 meter intercity bus
InterLAZ 12LE - 12 meter intercity bus
InterLAZ 13.5LE (LAZ-A191F0) - 13.5 meter intercity bus
LAZ Liner-9 (LAZ-A141) - 9 meter intercity bus
LAZ Liner-12 (LAZ-5207) - 12 meter intercity bus
LAZ A141 Liner (LAZ-A141D1) - 9.2 meter bus

Discontinued models
LAZ-695 "Lviv" (1956–2008)
LAZ-697 "Tourist" (1959–1985)
LAZ-699 (1964–2002)
LAZ-4202 (1978–1993)
LAZ-4204
LAZ-4969
LAZ-4206 (1986)
LAZ-4207 (1984–2002)
LAZ-5207 (1994–2002)
LAZ-5252 (1992–2006)
LAZ-52521
LAZ-52522 (1993–2006)
LAZ-52528 (2002–2004)
LAZ-52529
LAZ-5256
LAZ-5257
LAZ-A073 (1998)
LAZ-A291 (2001–2005)
LAZ-3202
LAZ-A173
LAZ-A141

Electric cars
 NAMI-LAZ-750 (1951)

Trailers
 LAZ-712 (1954)
 LAZ-729 (1954)
 LAZ-742B (1956)
 1-APM-3

Truck cranes
 AK-32 (1951, mounted on ZIS-150)
 LAZ-690 (1955–?, mounted on ZIS-150, ZIL-164, ZIL-164A)

Prototypes
LAZ-360
LAZ-360EM (1970)
LAZ-696 (1966)
LAZ-698 (1963)
LAZ-698 "Carpathians-1" (1960)
LAZ-698 "Carpathians-2" (1960, based on LAZ-697)
LAZ-5255 "Carpathians" (1980)
LAZ-6205 (1995)
LAZ-6206 (2000)
LAZ "Ukraine-1" (1961)
LAZ "Ukraine-2" (1961)
LAZ "Ukraine-67" (1967)
LAZ "Ukraine-69" (1969)
LAZ "Ukraine-71" (1971, prototype for LAZ-699N)
LAZ "Ukraine-73" (1973)
LAZ-E291 (2006, prototype 17 meter trolleybus)

See also
 SC Skify Lviv

References

External links 

 

Bus manufacturers of Ukraine
Bus manufacturers of the Soviet Union
LAZ
Trolleybus manufacturers
1945 establishments in Ukraine
Companies based in Lviv
Electric vehicle manufacturers of Ukraine